The Archdeacon of Bradford is a senior ecclesiastical officer within the Diocese of Leeds. The archdeaconry was originally created within the now-defunct Diocese of Bradford by Order in Council on 25 February 1921.

As Archdeacon she or he is responsible for the disciplinary supervision of the clergy within four area deaneries: Airedale, Bowling & Horton, Calverley and Otley.

Since the creation of the Diocese of Leeds on 20 April 2014, the archdeaconry forms the Bradford episcopal area under the Area Bishop of Bradford.

List of archdeacons
 1921–1928: William Stanton Jones
 1928–1932: Cecil Wilson (also Provost of Bradford, 1930–1931)
 1932–1934: Frederick Ackerley
 1934–1953: Sidney Lowe
 1953–1957: Kenneth Kay
 1957–1965: Hubert Higgs
 1965–1977: William Johnston
 1977–1984: Frank Sargeant
 1984–1999: David Shreeve
 1999–2004: Guy Wilkinson
 2004–2015: David Lee
 Alistair Helm (Acting)
 17 January 2016–present: Andy Jolley

References

Lists of Anglicans
 
Lists of English people
Anglican Diocese of Leeds